Anne Kelly Knowles (born 1957) is an American geographer and a specialist in Historical GIS.  After teaching for over ten years at Middlebury College in Vermont as a professor of geography, she is now a professor of history at University of Maine.

She received her MA and PhD from University of Wisconsin–Madison. Her first book, Calvinists Incorporated  Welsh Immigrants on Ohio’s Industrial Frontier examined the influence of immigrants’ traditions and social values on their economic behavior during the industrialization of their new region as workers and investors in Welsh-owned charcoal iron companies.

In 2002 she edited the first book ever published with case studies of the use of Historical GIS in various disciplines. She was the guest editor of a special issue of the journal Social Science History about this field.

Her research has included spatial analysis of the role of skilled ironworkers in the transfer of technology in the U.S. iron industry 1800-1868, and the mapping of the Holocaust.

Awards

Guggenheim Fellowship (2015).

John Brinkerhoff Jackson Book Award, Association of American Geographers (2014).

American Ingenuity Award for Historical Scholarship, Smithsonian magazine (2012).

National Science Foundation Collaborative Research Grant, Holocaust Historical GIS, with Alberto Giordano as fellow PI (2008 – 2011).

National Endowment for the Humanities Research Fellowship (2005).

American Council of Learned Societies Research Fellowship (1999).

References

Works
 Knowles, Anne Kelly; Tim Cole; Alberto Giordano (eds.). 2014. Geographies of the Holocaust Bloomington: Indiana University Press. At IU Press. . .
 Knowles, Anne Kelly. 2013. Mastering Iron: The Struggle to Modernize an American Industry. University of Chicago Press. 
 Placing History: How Maps, Spatial Data, and GIS Are Changing Historical Scholarship (2008), edited Knowles, digital supplement edited by Amy Hillier. Redlands, Cal.: ESRI Press. 
 Knowles, Anne Kelly ed. 2005. Emerging Trends in Historical GIS. In Historical Geography, Baton Rouge, LA: Geoscience Publications.
 Knowles, Anne Kelly, 2002. Past Time, Past Place: GIS for History. ESRI press 
 Knowles, Anne Kelly ed. 2000. Historical GIS: The Spatial Turn in Social Science History, Social Science History 24 (3).
 Knowles, Anne Kelly.  1997. Calvinists Incorporated: Welsh Immigrants on Ohio’s Industrial Frontier.

External links

 Faculty page at University of Maine
 References to Anne K. Knowles in Google Scholar
 References to Anne K. Knowles work in popular media. in New York Times

American geographers
1957 births
Living people
University of Wisconsin–Madison alumni
Middlebury College faculty
University of Maine faculty
Historical geographers
Women geographers